This article is about the weapons used in the Vietnam War, which involved the People's Army of Vietnam (PAVN) or North Vietnamese Army (NVA), National Liberation Front for South Vietnam (NLF) or Viet Cong (VC), and the armed forces of the China (PLA), Army of the Republic of Vietnam (ARVN), United States, Republic of Korea, Philippines, Thailand, and the Australian, New Zealand defence forces, and a variety of irregular troops.

Nearly all United States-allied forces were armed with U.S. weapons including the M1 Garand, M1 carbine, M14 and M16. The Australian and New Zealand forces employed the 7.62 mm L1A1 Self-Loading Rifle as their service rifle, with the occasional US M16.

The PAVN, although having inherited a variety of American, French, and Japanese weapons from World War II and the First Indochina War (aka French Indochina War), were largely armed and supplied by the People's Republic of China, the Soviet Union, and its Warsaw Pact allies. Further, some weapons—notably anti-personnel explosives, the K-50M (a PPSh-41 copy), and "home-made" versions of the RPG-2—were manufactured in North Vietnam. By 1969 the US Army had identified 40 rifle/carbine types, 22 machine gun types, 17 types of mortar, 20 recoilless rifle or rocket launcher types, nine types of antitank weapons, and 14 anti-aircraft artillery weapons used by ground troops on all sides. Also in use, mostly by anti-communist forces, were the 24 types of armored vehicles and self-propelled artillery, and 26 types of field artillery and rocket launchers.

Communist forces and weapons

During the early stages of their insurgency, the Viet Cong mainly sustained itself with captured arms (often of American manufacture) or crude, self-made weapons (e.g. copies of the US Thompson submachine gun and shotguns made of galvanized pipes). Most arms were captured from poorly defended ARVN militia outposts.

Communist forces were principally armed with Chinese and Soviet weaponry though some VC guerrilla units were equipped with Western infantry weapons either captured from French stocks during the first Indochina war, such as the MAT-49, or from ARVN units or requisitioned through illicit purchase.

In the summer and fall of 1967, all Viet Cong battalions were reequipped with arms of Soviet design such as the AK-47 assault rifle and the RPG-2 anti-tank weapon. Their weapons were principally of Chinese or Soviet manufacture. The period up to the conventional phase in the 1970, the Viet Cong and NVA were mostly limited to mortars, recoilless rifles, and small-arms and had significantly lighter equipment and firepower relative to the US arsenal, relying on ambushes, with superior stealth, planning, marksmanship, and small-unit tactics to face the disproportionate US technological advantage.

Many divisions within the NVA would incorporate armoured and mechanised battalions including the Type 59 tank., BTR-60, Type 60 artillery and rapidly altered and integrated new war doctrines following the Tet Offensive into a mobile combined-arms force. The North Vietnamese had both amphibious tanks (such as the PT-76) and light tanks (such the Type 62) used during the conventional phase. Experimental Soviet equipment started being used against ARVN forces at the same time, including Man-portable air-defense system SA-7 Grail and anti-tank missiles including the AT-3 Sagger. By 1975 they had fully transformed from the strategy of mobile light-infantry and using the people's war concept used against the United States.

US weapons
The American M16 rifle and XM177 carbine, which both replaced the M14, were lighter and considered more accurate than the AK-47 but in Vietnam was prone to "failure to extract", in which the spent cartridge case remained stuck in the chamber after a round was fired, preventing the next round from feeding and jamming the gun. This was ultimately traced to an inadequately tested switch in propellants from DuPont's proprietary IMR 4475 to Olin's WC 846, that Army Ordnance had ordered out of concern for standardization and mass production capacity.

The heavily armored, 90 mm gun M48A3 'Patton' tank saw extensive action during the Vietnam War and over 600 were deployed with U.S. forces. They played an important role in infantry support though there were a few tank versus tank battles. The M67A1 flamethrower tank (nicknamed the Zippo) was an M48 variant used in Vietnam. Artillery was used extensively by both sides but the Americans were able to ferry the lightweight 105 mm M102 howitzer by helicopter to remote locations on quick notice. With its  range, the Soviet 130 mm M-46 towed field gun was a highly regarded weapon and used to good effect by the PAVN. It was countered by the long-range, American 175 mm M107 Self-Propelled Gun (nicknamed Miller).

The United States had air superiority, though many aircraft were lost to surface-to-air missiles and anti-aircraft artillery. U.S. airpower was credited with breaking the siege of Khe Sanh and blunting the 1972 Easter Offensive against South Vietnam. At sea, the U.S. Navy had the run of the coastline, using aircraft carriers as platforms for offshore strikes and other naval vessels for offshore artillery support. Offshore naval fire played a pivotal role in the Battle of Huế in February 1968, providing accurate fire in support of the U.S. counter-offensive to retake the city.

The Vietnam War was the first conflict that saw wide scale tactical deployment of helicopters. The Bell UH-1 Iroquois nicknamed "Huey" was used extensively in counter-guerilla operations both as a troop carrier and a gunship. In the latter role it was outfitted with a variety of armaments including M60 machine guns, multi-barrelled 7.62 mm Miniguns and unguided air-to-surface rockets. The Hueys were also successfully used in MEDEVAC and search and rescue roles. Two aircraft which were prominent in the war were the AC-130 "Spectre" Gunship and the UH-1 "Huey" gunship. The AC-130 was a heavily armed ground-attack aircraft variant of the C-130 Hercules transport plane; it was used to provide close air support, air interdiction and force protection. The AC-130H "Spectre" was armed with two 20 mm M61 Vulcan cannons, one Bofors 40mm autocannon, and one 105 mm M102 howitzer. The Huey is a military helicopter powered by one turboshaft engine, and about 7,000 UH-1 aircraft saw service in Vietnam. At their disposal ground forces had access to B-52 and F-4 Phantom II and others to launch napalm, white phosphorus, tear gas and chemical weapons as well. The aircraft ordnance used during the war included precision-guided munition, cluster bombs, a thickening–gelling agent generally mixed with petroleum or a similar fuel for use in an incendiary device, initially against buildings and later mostly as an anti-personnel weapon that sticks to skin and can burn down to the bone.

The Claymore M18A1, an anti-personnel mine was widely used, and is command-detonated and directional shooting 700 steel pellets in the kill zone.

Weapons of the South Vietnamese, U.S., South Korean, Australian, Philippine, and New Zealand Forces

Hand combat weapons

 L1A1 and L1A2 bayonets – used on L1A1 Self-Loading Rifle
 M1905 bayonet – used on the M1 Garand.
 M1917 bayonet – used on various shotguns.
 M1 Bayonet – used on the M1 Garand.
 M3 fighting knife
 M4 bayonet – used on the M1 and M2 Carbine.
 M5 bayonet – used on the M1 Garand.
 M6 bayonet – used on the M14.
 M7 Bayonet – used on the M16.
 Ka-Bar Utility/fighting Knife – used by the US Army, Navy, and Marine Corps.
 Gerber Mark II U.S. Armed Forces
 Randall Made Knives – personally purchased by some US soldiers.
 M1905, M1917, M1 and Lee Enfield bayonets cut down and converted in to fighting knives.
 Bow – used by US Mobile Riverine Force.
 Crossbow – used by South Vietnamese Montagnards

Pistols and revolvers
 Colt M1911A1 – standard US and ARVN sidearm.
 Colt Commander – used by US military officers and US Special forces.
 Browning Hi-Power – used by Australian and New Zealand forces (L9 pistol). Also used on an unofficial basis by US reconnaissance and Special Forces units.
 Colt Model 1903 Pocket Hammerless – carried by US military officers. Replaced by the Colt Commander in the mid-1960s
 Colt Detective Special – .38 Special revolver, used by some ARVN officers
 Colt Police Positive Special – .38 Special revolver, used by USAF and tunnel rats 
 FN Baby Browning- .25 ACP pistol, used as a last resort weapon by MACVSOG. 
 High Standard HDM – Integrally suppressed .22LR handgun, supplemented by the Mark 22 Mod 0 in the later stages of the war.
 Ingram MAC-10 – automatic pistol used by US special operations forces.
 Luger P08 – CIA provided pistol
 M1917 revolver – .45 ACP revolver used by the South Vietnamese and US forces during the start of the war alongside the Smith & Wesson Model 10. Used prominently by tunnel rats.
 Quiet Special Purpose Revolver – 40. revolver used by tunnel rats.
 Smith & Wesson Model 10 – .38 Special revolver used by ARVN, by US Army and USAF pilots and by tunnel rats
 Smith & Wesson Model 12 – .38 Special revolver carried by US Army and USAF pilots.
 Smith & Wesson Model 15 – .38 Special revolver carried by USAF Security Police Units.
 Colt Python – .357 Magnum revolver carried by MACVSOG.
 Smith & Wesson Model 27 – .357 Magnum revolver carried by MACVSOG.
 Smith & Wesson Mark 22 Mod.0 "Hush Puppy" – Suppressed pistol used by US Navy SEALs and other U.S. special operations forces.
 Walther P38 – CIA provided pistol
 Walther PPK – Suppressed pistol used by MACVSOG recon skydiver team
 Welrod -Suppressed pistol used by MACVSOG.

Infantry rifles

 L1A1 Self-Loading Rifle – used by Australian and New Zealand soldiers in Vietnam

 M1 Garand – used by the South Vietnamese and South Koreans
 M1, M1A1, & M2 Carbine – used by the South Vietnamese Military, Police and Security Forces, South Koreans, U.S. military, and Laotians supplied by the U.S.

 M14, M14E2, M14A1 – issued to most U.S. troops from the early stages of the war until 1967–68, when it was replaced by the M16.
 M16, XM16E1, and M16A1 – M16 was issued in 1964, but due to reliability issues, it was replaced by the M16A1 in 1967 which added the forward assist and chrome-lined barrel to the rifle for increased reliability.
 CAR-15 – carbine variant of the M16 produced in very limited numbers, fielded by special operations early on. Later supplemented by the improved XM177.
 XM177 (Colt Commando)/GAU-5 – further development of the CAR-15, used heavily by MACV-SOG, the US Air Force, and US Army. 
 Stoner 63 – used by US Navy SEALs and USMC.
 T223 – a copy of the Heckler & Koch HK33 built under license by Harrington & Richardson used in small numbers by SEAL teams. Even though the empty H&R T223 was 0.9 pounds (0.41 kg) heavier than an empty M16A1, the weapon had a forty-round magazine available for it and this made it attractive to the SEALS. 
 MAS-36 rifle – used by South Vietnamese militias
 AK-47, AKM, and Type 56 – Captured rifles were used by South Vietnamese and U.S. forces.

Rifles: sniper, marksman
 M1C/D Garand and MC52 – used by CIA advisors, the USMC and the US Navy early in the war. About 520 were supplied to the ARVN and 460 to the Thai forces.
 M1903A4 Springfield – used by the USMC early in the war, replaced by the M40.
 M21 Sniper Weapon System – sniper variant of the M14 rifle used by the US Army.
 M40 (Remington Model 700)– bolt-action sniper rifle meant to replace the M1903A4 Springfield rifle and Winchester Model 70; used by the USMC
 Parker-Hale M82 – used by ANZAC forces
 Winchester Model 70 – used by the USMC
 Mosin Nagant – used by South Vietnamese militias

Submachine guns
 Beretta M12 – limited numbers were used by U.S. Embassy security units.
 Carl Gustaf m/45 – used by Navy SEALs in the start of the war, but later replaced by the Smith & Wesson M76 in the late 1960s. Significant numbers also used by MAC-V-SOG, South Vietnamese, and small numbers in Laos by advisors, and Laotian fighters.
 Smith & Wesson M76 – copy of the Carl Gustaf m/45; few were shipped to Navy SEALs fighting in Vietnam.
 F1 submachine gun – replaced the Owen Gun in Australian service.
 M3 Grease gun – standard U.S. military submachine gun, also used by the South Vietnamese
 M50/55 Reising – limited numbers were used by MACVSOG and other irregular forces.
 Madsen M-50 – used by South Vietnamese forces, supplied by the CIA.
 MAS-38 submachine gun – used by South Vietnamese militias.
 MAT-49 submachine gun – used by South Vietnamese militias. Captured models were used in limited numbers
 MP 40 submachine gun – used by South Vietnamese forces, supplied by the CIA.
 Owen Gun – standard Australian submachine-gun in the early stages of the war, later replaced by the F1 and withdrawn from combat use by 1971.
 Sten submachine gun – used by US special operations forces, often with a suppressor mounted.
 Sterling submachine gun – used by Australian Special Air Service Regiment and other special operations units.
 Thompson submachine gun – used often by South Vietnamese troops, and in small quantities by US artillery and helicopter units. 
 Uzi – used by special operations forces and some South Vietnamese, supplied from Israel.

Shotguns

Shotguns were used as an individual weapon during jungle patrol; infantry units were authorized a shotgun by TO&E (Table of Organization & Equipment). Shotguns were not general issue to all infantrymen, but were select issue weapons, such as one per squad, etc.

 Ithaca 37 – pump-action shotgun used by the United States and ARVN.
 Remington Model 10 – pump-action shotgun used by the United States.
 Remington Model 11-48 – semi-automatic shotgun used by US Army.
 Remington Model 31 – pump-action shotgun used by the US Army, the SEALs and the ARVN.
 Remington Model 870 – pump-action shotgun, main shotgun used by Marines, Army, and Navy after 1966.
 Remington 7188 – experimental select fire shotgun, withdrawn due to lack of reliability. Used by US Navy SEALs
 Savage Model 69E – pump-action shotgun used by the US Army.
 Savage Model 720 – semi-automatic shotgun.
 Stevens Model 77E – pump-action shotgun used by Army and Marine forces. Almost 70,000 Model 77Es were procured by the military for use in SE Asia during the 1960s. Also very popular with the ARVN because of its small size.
 Stevens Model 520/620
 Winchester Model 1912 – used by USMC.
 Winchester Model 1200 – pump-action shotgun used by the US Army.
 Winchester Model 1897 – used by the Marines during the early stages of the war.

Machine guns
 M60 machine gun – standard General-purpose machine gun for US, ANZAC, and ARVN forces throughout the war.

 Colt Machine Gun – experimental light machine gun deployed by SEAL Team 2 in 1970. 
 M1918 Browning Automatic Rifle – used by the ARVN during the early stages of the war, as well as many that were airdropped into Laos and used by Laotian fighters.
 FM 24/29 light machine gun – used by South Vietnamese militias 
 Heckler & Koch HK21 -Used by SEALs 
 RPD machine gun (and Type 56) – captured and used by reconnaissance teams of Mobile Strike Forces, MAC-V-SOG and other special operation forces. Also commonly modified to cut down the barrel.
 Stoner M63A Commando & Mark 23 Mod.0 – used by Navy SEALs and tested by Force Recon.
 M134 Minigun – 7.62 mm vehicle mounted machine gun (rare)
 M1917 Browning machine gun – .30cal heavy machine gun issued to the ARVN and also in limited use by the U.S. Army.
 M1919 Browning machine gun (and variants such as M37) – vehicle mounted machine gun. Meanwhile, still of use by many South Vietnamese infantry.
 M73 machine gun – tank mounted machine gun.
 Browning M2HB .50cal Heavy Machine Gun

Grenades and mines

 AN-M8 – white smoke grenade
 C4 explosive
 Mark 2 fragmentation grenade
 M1 smoke pot
 M26 fragmentation grenade and many subvariants
 M59 and M67 fragmentation grenade
 M6/M7-series riot control grenades – Used to clear NVA/VC out of caves, tunnels and buildings or stop a pursuer.
 AN/M14 TH3 thermite grenade – Incendiary grenade used to destroy equipment and as a fire-starting device.
 M15 and M34 smoke grenades – filled with white phosphorus, which ignites on contact with air and creates thick white smoke. Used for signalling and screening purposes, as well as an anti-personnel weapon in enclosed spaces, as the burning white phosphorus would rapidly consume any oxygen, suffocating the victims.
 M18 grenade Smoke Hand Grenade – Signalling/screening grenade available in red, yellow, green, and purple.
 V40 Mini-Grenade
 OF 37 grenade and DF 37 grenade, French grenades used by the ARVN in the 1950s
 XM58 riot control grenade – A miniature riot control grenade used by MACVSOG and Navy SEALs.
 M14 mine – anti-personnel blast mine
 M15 mine – anti-tank mine
 M16 mine – bounding anti-personnel fragmentation mine
 M18/M18A1 Claymore – command-detonated directional anti-personnel mine
 M19 mine – anti-tank mine

Grenade and Rocket Launchers
 M1/M2 rifle grenade adapters – used to convert a standard fragmentation grenade (M1) or smoke grenade (M2) into a rifle grenade when used with the M7 grenade launcher.
 M7 and M8 rifle grenade launcher – rifle grenade launcher used with respectively the M1 Garand and the M1 carbine, used by the South Vietnamese. Could fire the M9 and M17 rifle grenades.
 M31 HEAT rifle grenade – high-explosive anti-tank weapon used mostly by the U.S. Army before introducing the M72 LAW. Fired from the M1 Garand and M14 Rifle.
M79 grenade launcher – main U.S. grenade launcher used by all branches of the US military, ANZAC forces, and ARVN.
 China Lake grenade launcher – pump action weapon used in very small numbers.
XM148 grenade launcher – experimental underbarrel 40mm grenade launcher attached to the M16 rifle or XM177 carbine. Also issued to Australian Special Air Service Regiment in conjunction with the modified L1A1 and Sterling Submachine Gun. Withdrawn due to safety reasons.
 M203 grenade launcher – one-shot 40mm underslung grenade launcher designed to attach to an M16 rifle (or XM177 carbine, with modifications to the launcher). First tested in combat April 1969.
 Mark 18 Mod 0 grenade launcher – Hand-cranked, belt-fed, 40x46mm grenade launcher used by the US Navy.
Mark 19 grenade launcher – Automatic, belt-fed, 40x53mm grenade launcher.
 Mk 20 Mod 0 grenade launcher – Automatic, belt-fed, 40x46mm grenade launcher. Used mostly by riverine crews but also by Air Force Special Operations.
 XM174 grenade launcher – Automatic, belt-fed, 40x46mm grenade launcher used mainly by the US Army.
 Bazooka – The M9 variant was supplied to the ARVN during the early years of the war, while the M20 "Super Bazooka" was used by the USMC and the ARVN until the full introduction of the M67 90mm recoilless rifle and of the M72 LAW.
 BGM-71 TOW – wire-guided anti-tank missile But only fielded in 1972 and limited to use
 FIM-43 Redeye MANPADS (Man-Portable Air-Defence System) – shoulder-fired heat-seeking anti-air missile, used by the USMC.
 M72 LAW – 66mm anti-tank rocket launcher.
 RPG-2 - Used by MACVSOG
 XM202 – experimental four-shot 66mm incendiary rocket launcher.

Flamethrowers
 M2A1-7 and M9A1-7 flamethrowers

Infantry support weapons

 M18 recoilless rifle – 57mm shoulder-fired/tripod mounted recoilless rifle, used by the ARVN early in the war.
 M20 recoilless rifle – 75mm tripod/vehicle-mounted recoilless rifle, used by US and ARVN forces early in the war.
 M67 recoilless rifle – 90mm shoulder-fired anti-tank recoilless rifle, used by the US Army, US Marine Corps, ANZAC and ARVN selected forces.
 M40 recoilless rifle 106mm tripod/vehicle-mounted recoilless rifle.
 M2 mortar – 60mm mortar, used with the lighter but less accurate and lower-range M19 mortar.
 M19 mortar – 60mm mortar, used with the older, heavier M2 mortar.
Brandt Mle 27/31 – 81mm mortar, used by ARVN forces
M1 mortar – 81mm mortar, used by ARVN forces.
 M29 mortar – 81mm mortar, used by US and ARVN forces.
 L16A1 mortar – 81mm, used by ANZAC forces.
 82-BM-37 – captured 82mm mortar, few used by USMC with US rounds.
 M30 mortar 107mm mortar, used by US and ARVN forces.
 M98 Howtar, variant of the latter mounted on a M116 howitzer carriage.

Artillery

 M55 quad machine gun – used to defend US Army bases and on vehicles
 Oerlikon 20 mm cannon – used on riverine crafts
 Bofors 40 mm gun – used on riverine crafts
 105 mm Howitzer M101A1/M2A1
 105 mm Howitzer M102
 155 mm Howitzer M114
 M53 Self-propelled 155mm gun
 M55 Self-propelled 8-inch howitzer
 M107 Self-propelled 175mm gun
 M108 Self-propelled 105 mm howitzer
 M109 Self-propelled 155 mm howitzer
 M110 Self-propelled 8-inch howitzer
 75mm Pack Howitzer M1
 L5 pack howitzer 105 mm pack howitzer used by Australia and New Zealand
 MIM-23 Hawk – medium-range surface to air missile used in very small quantities by the US Marines.

Artillery ammunition types
 HE (High explosive) – standard artillery round.
 High-explosive anti-tank round – fired by 105 mm guns.
 White phosphorus – used for screening or incendiary purposes.
 Smoke shells – used for screening.
 Leaflet shell
 Beehive flechette rounds – antipersonnel rounds.
 Improved conventional munition – antipersonnel shell with submunitions.

Aircraft
(listed alphabetically by modified/basic mission code, then numerically in ascending order by design number/series letter)
 A-1 Skyraider – ground attack aircraft
 A-3 Skywarrior – carrier-based bomber
 A-4 Skyhawk – carrier-based strike aircraft
 A-6 Intruder – carrier-based all weather strike aircraft
 A-7 Corsair II – carrier-based strike aircraft
 A-26 Invader – light bomber
 A-37 Dragonfly – ground attack aircraft
 AC-47 Spooky – gunship
 AC-119G "Shadow" – gunship
 AC-119K "Stinger" – gunship
 AC-130 "Spectre" – gunship
 AU-23 Peacemaker – ground attack aircraft
 AU-24 Stallion – ground attack aircraft
 B-52 Stratofortress – heavy bomber
 B-57 Canberra – medium bomber
 Canberra B.20 – Royal Australian Air Force medium bomber
 C-1 Trader – cargo/transport aircraft
 C-2 Greyhound – cargo/transport aircraft
 C-5 Galaxy – strategic lift cargo aircraft
 C-7 Caribou – tactical cargo aircraft, used by the U.S. Air Force, the Royal Australian Air Force and the South Vietnamese Air Force
 C-46 Commando – cargo/transport aircraft
 C-47 – cargo/transport aircraft
 C-54 – transport aircraft
 C-97 Stratofreighter – cargo/transport aircraft
 C-119 Boxcar – cargo/transport aircraft
 C-121 Constellation – transport aircraft
 C-123 Provider – cargo/transport aircraft
 C-124 Globemaster II – cargo/transport aircraft
 C-130 Hercules – cargo/transport plane
 C-133 Cargomaster – cargo/transport aircraft
 C-141 Starlifter – strategic cargo aircraft
 E-1 Tracer – carrier-based airborne early warning (AEW) aircraft
 E-2 Hawkeye – carrier-based airborne early warning (AEW) aircraft
 EA-3 Skywarrior – carrier-based tactical electronic reconnaissance aircraft
 EA-6B Prowler – carrier-based electronic warfare & attack aircraft
 EB-57 Canberra – tactical electronic reconnaissance aircraft
 EB-66 – tactical electronic reconnaissance aircraft
 EC-121 – radar warning or sensor relay aircraft
 EF-10 Skyknight – tactical electronic warfare aircraft
 EKA-3B Skywarrior – carrier-based tactical electronic warfare aircraft
 F-4 Phantom II – carrier and land based fighter-bomber
 F-5 Freedom Fighter – light-weight fighter used in strike aircraft role
 F8F Bearcat – piston fighter-bomber, used by the South Vietnamese Air Force until 1964.
 F-8 Crusader – carrier and land based fighter-bomber
 F-14 Tomcat – carrier-based fighter, made its combat debut during Operation Frequent Wind, the evacuation of Saigon, in April 1975.
 F-100 Super Sabre – fighter-bomber
 F-102 Delta Dagger – fighter
 F-104 Starfighter – fighter
 F-105 Thunderchief – fighter-bomber
 F-111 Aardvark – medium bomber
 HU-16 Albatross – rescue amphibian
 KA-3 Skywarrior – carrier-based tactical aerial refueler aircraft
 KA-6 Intruder – carrier-based tactical aerial refueler aircraft
 KB-50 Superfortress – aerial refueling aircraft
 KC-130 Hercules – tactical aerial refueler/assault transport aircraft
 KC-135 Stratotanker – aerial refueling aircraft
 O-1 Bird Dog – light observation airplane
 O-2 Skymaster – observation aircraft
 OV-1 Mohawk – battlefield surveillance and light strike aircraft
 OV-10 Bronco – light attack/observation aircraft
 P-2 Neptune – maritime patrol aircraft
 P-3 Orion – maritime patrol aircraft
 P-5 Marlin – antisubmarine seaplane
 QU-22 Pave Eagle (Beech Bonanza) – electronic monitoring signal relay aircraft
 RA-3B Skywarrior – carrier-based tactical photographic reconnaissance aircraft
 RA-5C Vigilante – carrier-based tactical photographic reconnaissance aircraft
 RB-47 Stratojet – photographic reconnaissance aircraft
 RB-57 Canberra – tactical photographic reconnaissance aircraft
 RB-66 – tactical photographic reconnaissance aircraft
 RF-4 Phantom II – carrier and land-based tactical photographic reconnaissance aircraft
 RF-8 Crusader – carrier-based tactical photographic reconnaissance aircraft
 RF-101 Voodoo – tactical photographic reconnaissance aircraft
 RT-33A – reconnaissance jet
 S-2 Tracker – carrier-based anti-submarine warfare (ASW) aircraft
 SR-71 Blackbird – strategic reconnaissance aircraft
 TF-9J Cougar – fast forward air controller
 T-28 Trojan – trainer/ground attack aircraft
 T-41 Mescalero – trainer aircraft
 U-1 Otter – transport aircraft
 U-2 – reconnaissance aircraft
 U-6 Beaver – utility aircraft
 U-8 Seminole – transport/electronic survey aircraft
 U-10 Helio Courier – utility aircraft
 U-17 Skywagon – utility aircraft
 U-21 Ute – liaison and electronic survey
 YO-3 Quiet Star – light observation airplane

Helicopters
(listed numerically in ascending order by design number/series letter, then alphabetically by mission code)
 UH-1 Iroquois "Huey" – utility transport and gunship helicopter
 AH-1G HueyCobra – attack helicopter
 AH-1J SeaCobra – twin-engine attack helicopter
 UH-1N Iroquois – twin-engine utility helicopter
 UH-2 Seasprite – carrier-based utility helicopter
 CH-3 Sea King – long-range transport helicopter
 HH-3 "Jolly Green Giant" – long-range combat search and rescue (CSAR) helicopter
 SH-3 Sea King – carrier-based anti-submarine warfare (ASW) helicopter
 OH-6A Cayuse "Loach" (from LOH – Light Observation Helicopter) – light transport/observation (i.e. scout) helicopter
 OH-13 Sioux – light observation helicopter
 UH-19 Chickasaw – utility transport helicopter
 CH-21 Shawnee – cargo/transport helicopter
 OH-23 Raven – light utility helicopter
 CH-34 Choctaw – cargo/transport helicopter
 CH-37 Mojave – cargo/transport helicopter
 HH-43 Huskie – rescue helicopter
 CH-46 Sea Knight – cargo/transport helicopter
 CH-47 Chinook – cargo/transport helicopter
 CH-53 Sea Stallion – heavy-lift transport helicopter
 HH-53 "Super Jolly Green Giant" – long-range combat search and rescue (CSAR) helicopter
 CH-54 Tarhe "Sky Crane" – heavy lift helicopter
 OH-58A Kiowa – light transport/observation helicopter

Aircraft ordnance

 GBUs
 CBUs
 BLU-82 Daisy cutter
 Napalm
 Bomb, 250 lb, 500 lb, 750 lb, 1000 lb, HE (high explosive), general-purpose
 Rocket, aerial, HE (High Explosive), 2.75 inch

Aircraft weapons

 M60D machine gun – 7.62mm (helicopter mount)
 Minigun – 7.62 mm (aircraft and helicopter mount)
 Colt Mk 12 cannon – 20 mm (aircraft mount)
 M3 cannon – 20 mm (aircraft mount)
 M39 cannon – 20 mm (aircraft mount)
 M61 Vulcan – 20 mm (aircraft mount), M195 was used on AH-1
 M197 Gatling gun – 20 mm (used on AH-1J helicopters)
 M75 grenade launcher – 40 mm (helicopter mount)
 M129 grenade launcher – 40 mm (helicopter mount)
 AIM-4 Falcon
 AIM-7 Sparrow
 AIM-9 Sidewinder
 AGM-12 Bullpup
 AGM-22
 AGM-45 Shrike
 AGM-62 Walleye
 AGM-78 Standard ARM
 AGM-65 Maverick

Chemical weapons
Rainbow Herbicides
Agent Orange – While developed to be used as a herbicide to destroy natural obstacles and tree camouflage, it was later revealed that it posed health risks to those exposed to it.
Agent Blue – Used to destroy agricultural land that was believed to be used to grow food for the VC/NVA.
Agent Green
Agent White
Napalm
CS-1 riot control agent – "Teargas", used in grenades, cluster bomblets or (rarely) shells.
 CN gas – "teargas"

Vehicles
In addition to cargo-carrying and troop transport roles, many of these vehicles were also equipped with weapons and sometimes armor, serving as "gun trucks" for convoy escort duties.
 M274 Truck, Platform, Utility, 1/2 Ton, 4X4 – Commonly called a "Mechanical Mule".
 Land Rover (short and long wheelbase) – Australian and New Zealand forces.
 CJ-3B and M606 – 1/4 ton jeep
 Willys M38A1 – ¼ ton jeep.
 M151 – ¼ ton jeep.
 Dodge M37 – 3/4 ton truck.
 Kaiser Jeep M715 – 1¼-ton truck.
 M76 Otter – 1¼-ton amphibious cargo carrier used by USMC.
 M116 Husky – 1¼-ton amphibious cargo carrier, tested by USMC.
 M733 – 1¼-ton amphibious personnel carrier, M116 variant, tested by USMC.
 M35 series 2½-ton 6x6 cargo truck
 M135 2½-ton truck
 M54 5-ton 6x6 truck
 M548 – 6-ton tracked cargo carrier
 M520 Goer – 4x4 8-ton cargo truck.
 M123 and M125 10-ton 6x6 trucks

Other vehicles
 Caterpillar D7E bulldozer – used by US Army
 Various graders and bulldozers used by the USMC
 ERDLator

Combat vehicles

Tanks
 M24 Chaffee – light tank; main ARVN tank early in the war, used at least as late as the Tet Offensive.
 M41A3 Walker Bulldog – light tank, replaced the M24 Chaffee as the main ARVN tank from 1965.
 M48 Patton – main tank of the US Army and Marines throughout the war, and also used by ARVN forces from 1971.
 M67 "Zippo" – flamethrower variant of the M48 Patton, used by USMC.
 M551 Sheridan – Armored Reconnaissance Airborne Assault Vehicle/Light Tank, used by the US Army from 1969.
 Centurion Mk 5 Main Battle Tank – used by the Australian Army, with AVLB and ARV variants.

Other armored vehicles
 C15TA Armoured Truck – used by the ARVN early in the war
 LVTP5 (aka AMTRACs) – amphibious tractors/landing craft used by USMC and later by RVNMD
 Lynx Scout Car Mk II – used by the ARVN
 M113 – APC (Armored Personnel Carrier)
 M113 ACAV – Armored Cavalry Assault Vehicle
 M163 Vulcan – self-propelled anti-aircraft tank
 M114 – reconnaissance vehicle
 M132 Armored Flamethrower
 M106 mortar carrier
 M2 Half Track Car
 M3 Scout Car – used by South Vietnamese forces early in the war.
 M3 Half-track – used by South Vietnamese forces early in the war.
 M5 Half-track
 M9 Half-track
 Cadillac Gage V-100 Commando – replaced ARVN M8 armored cars in 1967. Also used by US forces as M706 Commando.
 M8 Greyhound Used by ARVN forces early in the war.
 M56 Scorpion – limited use in 1965–1966
 M50 Ontos – self-propelled 106 mm recoilless rifle carrier used by the USMC until 1969.
 M42 Duster – M41 based hull, with a twin 40 mm antiaircraft gun mounted on an open turret
 M728 Combat Engineer Vehicle – modified M60 Patton tank equipped with dozer blade, short-barrelled 165mm M135 Demolition Gun, and A-Frame crane.
 M60 AVLB – armored vehicle launched bridge using M60 Patton chassis.
 M51 Armored Recovery Vehicle – fielded by US Marines.
 M578 light recovery vehicle
 M88 Recovery Vehicle – armored recovery vehicle based on M48 chassis.
 Wickums armored draisine used by the ARVN.

Naval craft

 LCM-6 and LCM-8 – with several modifications:
 LCMs modified as a river monitors
 Armored Troop Carrier
 Command and Communication Boat (CCB)
 other variants included helipad boats and tankers
 LCVP – Landing craft vehicle personnel, some made by the French Services Techniques des Construction et Armes Navales/France Outremer and known as FOM
 Swift Boat – Patrol Craft Fast (PCF)
 ASPB – assault support patrol boat
 PBR – Patrol Boat River, all-fiberglass boats propelled by twin water jets, used by the US Navy
 Hurricane Aircat – airboat used by ARVN and US Army

Communications

Radios
The geographically dispersed nature of the war challenged existing military communications. From 1965 to the final redeployment of tactical units, numerous communications-electronics systems were introduced in Vietnam to upgrade the quality and quantity of tactical communications and replace obsolete gear:
 AN/PRT-4 and PRR-9 squad radios – replaced the AN/PRC-6.
 AN/PRC-6 and AN/PRC-10 – older short range radios, used for outposts
 AN/PRC-25 and 77 – short-range FM radios that replaced the AN/PRC-8-10.
 AN/VRC-12 series (VRC-43, VRC-45, VRC-46, VRC-47, VRC-48) – FM radios that replaced the RT-66-67-68/GRC (including AN/GRC 3–8, VRC 7–10, VRC 20–22, and VRQ 1–3 sets).
 AN/GRC-106 – AM radios and teletypewriter that replaced the AN/GRC-19.
 TA-312 and TA-1 field telephones.

Encryption systems

Encryption systems developed by the National Security Agency and used in Vietnam included:

 NESTOR – tactical secure voice system, including the TSEC/KY-8, 28 and 38 was used with the PRC-77 and VRC-12
 KW-26 – protected higher level teletype traffic 
 KW-37 – protected the U.S. Navy fleet broadcast
 KL-7 – provided offline security
 A number of paper encryption and authentication products, including one time pads and the KAL-55B Tactical Authentication System

Weapons of the PAVN/VC, China, Soviet and North Korea Forces

The PAVN and the Southern communist guerrillas, the Viet Cong (VC) as they were commonly referred to during the war, largely used standard Warsaw Pact weapons. Weapons used by the PAVN also included Chinese Communist variants, which were referred to as CHICOM's by the US military. Captured weapons were also widely used; almost every small arm used by SEATO may have seen limited enemy use. During the early 1950s, US equipment captured in Korea was also sent to the Viet Minh.

Small arms

Hand combat weapons

 A wide variety of bayonets meant for fitting on the many types of rifles used by the NVA and VC.
 Type 30 bayonet
 Spears, used during "suicide attacks"
 Other types of knives, bayonets, and blades

Handguns and revolvers
 Makarov PM (and Chinese Type 59)
 Mauser C96 – Locally produced copies were used alongside Chinese copies and German variants supplied by the Soviets.
 Nagant M1895 
Webley Mk2 
Mac M1892 
Smith and Wesson Model 10 
 M1911 pistol
 M1935A pistol
 SA vz. 61 – automatic pistol
 Tokarev TT-33 – Standard pistol, including Chinese Type 51 and Type 54 copies including Zastava M57
 Walther P38 – Captured by the Soviets during World War II and provided to the VPA and the NLF as military aid
 Home-made pistols, such as copies of the M1911, Luger or of the Mauser C96 (Cao Dai 763) or crude one-shot guns, were also used by the Viet Cong early in the war.

Automatic and semi-automatic rifles
 SKS (Chinese Type 56) semi-automatic carbine
 AK-47 – from the Soviet Union, Warsaw Pact countries, China and North Korea
 Type 56 – Chinese-made standard rifle
 Type 58 – Limited use from North Korea
 PMK – Polish-made AK-47
 AKM – from the Soviet Union, common modernized variant of the AK-47
 PM md. 63/65 – Romanian variant of AKM
 AMD-65 – Very limited use from Hungary
 M1/M2 carbines – common and popular captured semi-automatic rifles
 M1 Garand- Captured from South Vietnamese forces 
 vz. 52 rifle semi-automatic rifle, very rarely used
 Vz. 58 assault rifle
 Sturmgewehr 44 Limited
 Type 63 assault rifle – Limited use, received during the 1970s
 M14, M16A1 – captured from US and South Vietnamese forces.
 MAS-49 rifle – captured French rifle from First Indochina War

Rifles: bolt-action, marksman
 Arisaka rifles – Used by Viet Cong early in the war.
 Berthier rifles- Used by Vietcong early in the war
 Chiang Kai-shek rifle – Used by recruits and militias
 Mosin–Nagant – Bolt-action rifles and carbines from the Soviet Union and China (especially M44).
 Mauser Kar98k – Bolt-action rifle (captured from the French during the First Indochina War and also provided by the Soviets as military aid).
 MAS-36 rifle
 Lee–Enfield – Used by the Viet Cong
 Lebel rifle – Used earlier in the war.
 M1903 Springfield – Used by Viet Cong forces
 M1917 Enfield – Used by Viet Cong forces
 Remington Model 10 – pump-action shotgun used by the Viet Cong
 SVD Dragunov – Soviet semi-automatic sniper rifle in limited use
 vz. 24 – Used by Viet Cong forces.
 Older or rarer rifles where often modified by the Viet Cong early in the war: Gras mle 1874 carbines were rechambered to .410 bore while Destroyer carbines were modified to accept the magazine of the Walther P38.
 Home-made rifles, often spring-action rifles made to look like a M1 Garand or a M1 Carbine, were also used by the Viet Cong.

Submachine guns
 K-50M submachine gun (Vietnamese edition, based on Chinese version of Russian PPSh-41, under licence)
 MAT-49 submachine gun – Captured during the French-Indochina War. Many were converted from 9x19mm to 7.62x25 Tokarev
 PPSh-41 submachine gun (both Soviet, North Korean and Chinese versions)
 PPS-43 submachine gun (both Soviet and Chinese versions)
 M3 submachine gun Limited use
 Thompson submachine gun – including Vietnamese copies
 MP 40
 MP 38 submachine gun – Limited use.
Smith and Wesson M76 submachine gun - captured from US forces 
 MAS-38 submachine gun – Captured from the French in the Indochina War.
 PM-63 submachine gun – Used by tank crews
 M49 submachine gun – limited use, received from Yugoslavia
 M56 submachine gun – limited use, received from Yugoslavia 
 Vietnamese home-made submachine guns, inspired by the Sten or the Thompson, were used by the Viet Cong early in the war.

Shotguns
  Homemade shotguns, some inspired by the BAR or the Arisaka Type 99, were used by the Viet Cong early in the war.  
Various Remington models captured from ARVN and US forces

Machine guns
 Bren light machine gun, used by Viet Cong
 Degtyarev DP (DPM and RP-46 variants and Chinese Type 53 and Type 58 copies)
 DShK heavy machine gun (including Chinese Type 54)
 FM-24/29 – used by Viet Cong Forces
 KPV heavy machine gun
 Lewis gun
 M1918 Browning Automatic Rifle
 M1917 Browning machine gun – at least 1 used by the Viet Cong
 M1919 Browning machine gun – captured from ARVN/US forces
 M60 machine gun – captured from ARVN/US forces
M2 Browning – captured from ARVN/US forces
MG 34 – captured by the Soviets during World War II and provided to the VPA and the NLF as military aid
MG 42 – captured by the Soviets during World War II and provided to the VPA and the NLF as military aid
FG 42 – Limited use, captured by the Soviets during World War II and supplied in the 1950s
 Maxim machine-gun M1910
 PK Very limited use general-purpose machine gun from Soviet Union 
 Reibel Machinegun 
 RPD light machine gun (and Chinese Type 56 and North Korean Type 62 copies) – first used in 1964
 RPK light machine gun of Soviet design
 SG-43/SGM medium machine guns including Type 53 and Type 57 Chinese copies of these guns
 Type 11 light machine gun
 Type 24 machine gun (Chinese-made MG-08) – used by the Viet Cong Forces
 Type 67 machine gun
 Type 92 heavy machine gun
 Type 99 light machine gun
 Uk vz. 59 general-purpose machine gun
 ZB vz. 26 light machine gun (included Chinese copies)
 ZB vz.30 light machine gun from Czechoslovakia

Grenades, mines, and booby traps

 Molotov cocktail
 Home-made grenades and IEDs
Punji sticks
Cartridge traps
 F1 grenade (Chinese Type 1)
 M29 grenade – captured
 M79 grenade launcher – captured from US or ARVN forces
M203 grenade launcher – captured from US or ARVN forces
 Model 1914 grenade
 RG-42 grenade (Chinese Type 42)
 RGD-1 and RGD-2 smoke grenades
 RGD-5 grenade (Chinese Type 59)
 RGD-33 stick Grenade
 RKG-3 anti-tank grenade (Chinese Type 3)
 RPG-40 anti-tank hand grenade
 RPG-43 high-explosive anti-tank (HEAT) hand grenade
 RPG-6
 Type 4 grenade
 Type 10 grenade
 Type 67 and RGD-33 stick grenades
 Type 64 rifle grenade – fired from AT-44 grenade launchers, fitted to Mosin-Nagant carbines
 Type 91 grenade
 Type 97 grenade
 Type 99 grenade
 Type 10 grenade discharger
 Type 89 grenade discharger
 Lunge mine
M16 mine – Captured.
M18/M18A1 Claymore mine – Captured.

Flamethrower
 LPO-50 flamethrower
 Type 74 Chinese-built copy

Rocket launchers, recoilless rifles, anti-tank rifles and lightweight guided missiles

 Recoilless rifles were known as DKZ (Đại-bác Không Giật).
RPG-2 recoilless rocket launcher (both Soviet, Chinese and locally produced B-40 and B-50 variants used)
RPG-7 recoilless rocket launcher
Type 51 (Chinese copy of the M20 Super Bazooka) – used by Viet Cong as late as 1964
B-10 recoilless rifle
B-11 recoilless rifle
SPG-9 73 mm recoilless rifle
M18 recoilless rifle (and Chinese Type 36 copy) and captured from US or ARVN forces
M20 recoilless rifle (and Chinese Type 52 and Type 56 copies) and captured from US or ARVN forces
PTRD Limited use by the Viet Cong Forces.
9K32 Strela-2 (SA-7) anti-aircraft weapon
9M14 Malyutka (AT-3 Sagger)

Mortars

 Brandt Mle 1935 – 60mm mortar
 M2 mortar (including Chinese Type 31 and Type 63 copies) – 60mm mortars
 M19 mortar – 60mm mortar
 M1 mortar – 81mm
 M29 mortar – 81mm
 Brandt Mle 27/31 – 81mm mortar
 Type 97 81mm mortar
82-PM-37 (including Chinese Type 53 copy)- 82mm mortar
 82-PM-41 – 82mm mortar.
 Type 67 mortar – 82mm mortar
 Type 94 90mm mortar
 Type 97 90 mm mortar
 M1938 107mm mortar
 120-PM-43 mortar
Type 97 150 mm mortar
 M1943 160mm mortar (including Chinese Type 55 copy)

Field artillery rocket launchers
Field artillery rockets were often fired from improvised launchers, sometimes a tube fixed with bamboo.
 102mm 102A3 rockets
 107mm Type 63 MRL – used with one-tube or 12-tube launchers
 single-tube 122mm 9M22M rocket taken from BM-21 Grad MRL
 single-tube 140mm M14-OF rocket taken from BM-14 MRL

Field guns and howitzers
 57 mm anti-tank gun M1943 (ZiS-2)
 70 mm Type 92 battalion gun
Type 41 75 mm mountain gun, supplied by China
 7.5 cm Pak 40
 75mm M116 pack howitzer, supplied by China
 76 mm divisional gun M1942 (ZiS-3) (and Chinese Type 54)
 85 mm divisional gun D-44
 100 mm field gun M1944 (BS-3)
 Type 91 10 cm howitzer, supplied by China
 M101 howitzer
 122 mm gun M1931/37 (A-19)
 122 mm howitzer M1938 (M-30)
 D-74 122 mm field gun
 130 mm towed field gun M1954 (M-46)
 152 mm howitzer-gun M1937 (ML-20)
 152 mm howitzer M1943 (D-1)
 152 mm towed gun-howitzer M1955 (D-20)
 M114 155 mm howitzer

Anti-aircraft weapons
 ZPU-1/2/4 single, double, and quad 14.5 mm anti-aircraft machine guns
 ZU-23 twin 23 mm anti-aircraft cannon
 M1939 37 mm anti-aircraft gun (and Chinese Type 55)
 2 cm Flak 30 anti-aircraft gun of German origin WW II
 S-60 57 mm anti-aircraft gun
 85mm air defense gun M1944
 100 mm air defense gun KS-19
 8.8 cm Flak 18/36/37/41
 S-75 Dvina Soviet high-altitude air defence system
 S-125 Neva Soviet high-altitude air defence system

Aircraft
 Aero Ae-45 trainer aircraft
 Aero L-29 Delfín trainer aircraft
 An-2 utility aircraft
 Cessna A-37 Dragonfly attack aircraft – limited use of captured or defected
 Ilyushin Il-12 transport aircraft
 Ilyushin Il-14 transport aircraft
 Ilyushin Il-28 jet bomber
 Lisunov Li-2 transport aircraft
 Mikoyan-Gurevich MiG-15 (and Chinese F-4) jet trainer
 MiG-17 (and Chinese F-5) jet fighter
 MiG-19 (and Chinese F-6) jet fighter
 MiG-21 jet fighter
 North American T-28 Trojan – 1 ex-Laotian used in 1964
 Yakovlev Yak-18 trainer aircraft
 Zlín Z 26 trainer aircraft

Aircraft weapons
 Gryazev-Shipunov GSh-23
 Nudelman-Rikhter NR-30
 Nudelman N-37
 Nudelman-Rikhter NR-23
 K-5 (missile) (RS-2US)
 K-13 (missile) (R-3S)

Helicopters
 Mi-2
 Mi-4
 Mi-6
 Mi-8

Tanks
 M24 Chaffee – light tank, captured from the French and used for training early in the war
 M41 Walker Bulldog – light tank, captured from the ARVN.
 M48 Patton – captured from the ARVN.
 PT-76 amphibious tank
 SU-76 self-propelled gun
 SU-100 self-propelled guns in limited numbers.
 SU-122 self-propelled gun in limited numbers
 T-34-85 medium tank, from 1959
 T-54 main battle tanks, used from 1965
 Type 59 main battle tanks
 Type 62 light tank
 Type 63 anti-aircraft self-propelled systems
 Type 63 amphibious tank
 ZSU-57-2 anti-aircraft self-propelled systems
 ZSU-23-4 anti-aircraft self-propelled systems

Other armored vehicles
 BTR-40 APC
 BTR-50 APC
 BTR-60PB APC
 BTR-152 APC
 M3 Half-track and M8 Light Armored Car – first NVA armored vehicles. Used to protect Air Bases in the North.
 M113 armored personnel carrier – captured from the ARVN
 MTU-20 armored bridge-layer
 Type 63 APC

Support vehicles

 AT-L light artillery tractor
 AT-S and ATS-59 medium artillery tractors
 Beijing BJ212
 Dnepr M-72
 GAZ-AA
 GAZ-MM
 GAZ-46 light amphibious car
 GAZ-51 truck (and Chinese copy)
 GAZ-63 truck
 GAZ-64
 GAZ-67
 GAZ-69
 IFA W 50
 KrAZ-255 heavy truck
  artillery tractor
 MAZ-502 truck
 M35 truck series (captured)
 M54 truck series (captured)
 M151 jeep (captured)
 PMZ-A-750
 ZIS-150 truck (and Chinese CA-10)
 UralZIS-355M truck
 Ural-375
 ZIL-130 truck
 ZIL-151 truck
 ZIL-157 and ZIL-157K trucks (and Chinese CA-30)
 ZiS-485 amphibious vehicle

Naval craft
 Swatow-class gunboats
 P4 and P6 torpedo boats
 Countless civilian-type sampans – mainly used for smuggling supplies and weapons

See also
 NLF and PAVN strategy, organization and structure
 NLF and PAVN logistics and equipment
 NLF and PAVN battle tactics
 Weapons of the Laotian Civil War
 Weapons of the Cambodian Civil War
Weapons of the First Indochina War

References

Citations and notes

Bibliography

External links
 

Vietnam War-related lists
Vietnam War
Vietnam War